Amilcare Malagola (born 24 December 1840 in Modena, Italy – died 22 June 1895 in Modena) was a Cardinal of the Catholic Church, and was archbishop of Fermo 1877–1895.

He was made cardinal by Pope Leo XIII in 1893.

References

19th-century Italian cardinals
Cardinals created by Pope Leo XIII
Religious leaders from Modena
1840 births
1895 deaths
Archbishops of Fermo
19th-century Italian Roman Catholic bishops